Dimitrije "Dimitri" Davidović, born 21 May 1944 is a Serbian–Belgian football manager and former player.

Playing career
Davidović was a professional soccer player during 16 years in the first divisions of Europe.

FK Partizan
Born in Aleksandrovac, Yugoslavia, Davidović started his career with FK Partizan going through all selections and played professionally there for five years. With the club, he won the Yugoslavian championship and played in the finals of the European Cup.

Oakland Clippers
In 1967, Davidovic signed with the Oakland Clippers of the National Professional Soccer League. They won both the Western Division and league championships that year. In 1968, the NPSL merged with the United Soccer Association to form the North American Soccer League. Davidovic remained with the Clippers in 1968, but the team withdrew from the league at the end of the season.

NEC Nijmegen
1969–1971, where he led the team as captain.

Lierse S.K.
1971–1978 During his seven-year stay, they were twice Cup finalists and took part in the Europe Cup.

San Jose Earthquakes
In 1978, Davidovic returned to the United States and signed with the San Jose Earthquakes of the NASL. He spent one season in San Jose, scoring one goal in twenty-seven games.

Awards
1	Asian Cup Winners Cup, Continental Cup.
1	Gulf Cup.
3x	Champion of Saudi Arabia, King Fahed Cup.
1	Cup of Saudi Arabia, Crown Prince Cup.
2	Federation Cup, Saudi Arabia.
1	Champion of U.A.E.
1	Cup of U.A.E.
1	Federation Cup, U.A.E.
1	Bronze medal in the Asian Cup Championship
1	H.R.H. Prince Abdullah Al Faisal Cup
1	Winning playoffs and promotion to the highest Belgian division

External links
 
 NASL career stats
 

1944 births
Living people
Association football midfielders
Yugoslav footballers
Serbian footballers
Belgian footballers
Yugoslav First League players
Eredivisie players
Belgian Pro League players
National Professional Soccer League (1967) players
North American Soccer League (1968–1984) players
FK Partizan players
NEC Nijmegen players
Lierse S.K. players
Oakland Clippers players
San Jose Earthquakes (1974–1988) players
Serbian expatriate footballers
Yugoslav expatriate footballers
Expatriate soccer players in the United States
Expatriate footballers in the Netherlands
Yugoslav football managers
Serbian football managers
Belgian football managers
Lierse S.K. managers
Royal Antwerp F.C. managers
Budapest Honvéd FC managers
Ittihad FC managers
Qatar SC managers
Expatriate football managers in Qatar
Expatriate football managers in Saudi Arabia
Al-Ahli Saudi FC managers
K.V. Kortrijk managers
Al-Wasl F.C. managers
Expatriate football managers in Hungary
Belgian people of Serbian descent